The 1976–77 European Cup was the 12th edition of the European Cup, IIHF's premier European club ice hockey tournament. The season started on October 12, 1976, and finished on February 13, 1979.

The tournament was won by Poldi Kladno, who beat Spartak Moscow in the final

First round

 Podhale Nowy Targ,   
 IF Frisk,   
 Dynamo Berlin,   
 EC KAC   :  bye

Second round

 Brynäs IF,   
 TPS,   
 Poldi Kladno,  
 Spartak Moscow   :  bye

Quarterfinals

Semifinals

Finals

References
 Season 1977

1
IIHF European Cup